Reginald Ernest Foulkes (23 February 1923 – 24 November 2014) was a footballer and a member of the Norwich City F.C. Hall of Fame.

Foulkes made 238 appearances for Norwich City as a centre-half between 1950 and 1956, scoring eight times.

Previously at Walsall, for whom he made 160 appearances in the Football League, Foulkes was the first signing of City manager Norman Low. Foulkes was Norwich captain and led the side to finish second, third and fourth in Division Three South in his first three seasons.

Foulkes died in November 2014 at the age of 91.

References

External links

1923 births
2014 deaths
Sportspeople from Shrewsbury
English footballers
Association football central defenders
Birmingham City F.C. players
Walsall F.C. players
Norwich City F.C. players
Wisbech Town F.C. players
English Football League players
English football managers